Gustav Hæhre (5 September 1878 – 22 September 1950) was a Norwegian rower who competed for Christiania Roklub. He competed in coxed eight and in coxed four, inriggers at the 1912 Summer Olympics in Stockholm.

References

External links
 
 

1878 births
1950 deaths
Sportspeople from Drammen
Norwegian male rowers
Rowers at the 1908 Summer Olympics
Rowers at the 1912 Summer Olympics
Olympic rowers of Norway